Keed Talk to 'Em is the fourth mixtape by American rapper Lil Keed. It was released on December 12, 2018, by YSL Records and 300 Entertainment.

Background 
Featuring 14 songs and collaborators including Slimelife Shawty, Lil Duke, Lil Durk, Trippie Redd, Brandy, Yung Mal, Dae Dae, Lil Yachty, 21 Savage, and Paper Lovee. The mixtape is his second mixtape after Trapped in Cleveland 2, which was released in July 2018.

Singles 
"Balenciaga" featuring 21 Savage was released as the lead single from the album. "Nameless" was released as the second single from the album.

Track listing 
Credits adapted from AllMusic.

References

2018 albums
Lil Keed albums
Albums produced by Cubeatz
Albums produced by Honorable C.N.O.T.E.
YSL Records albums